Santa Maria Maddalena dei Pazzi is a Renaissance-style Roman Catholic church and a former convent located in Borgo Pinti in central Florence.

History
The Pazzi name was added after the Carmelite order nun Maria Maddalena de' Pazzi, canonized in 1669, whose family patronized the church. The original convent had been dedicated to St. Mary Magdalen delle Convertite, the patron of once-fallen, now converted women. The Cistercian order from Badia a Settimo took control of the site in 1332 and moved to it in 1442, while the convent was transferred to San Donato in Polverosa. However, the church and chapter house were rebuilt between 1481 and 1500, with initial designs in 1492 by Giuliano da Sangallo.

The 13th-century interiors were redecorated in the 17th and early 18th centuries, which removed the altarpieces by masters such as Botticelli, Perugino, Lorenzo di Credi, Domenico Ghirlandaio, and Raffaellino del Garbo. They were replaced by new ones from minor masters such as Carlo Portelli, Alfonso Boschi, Domenico Puligo, Santi di Tito, and Francesco Curradi. In the chapter house is a fresco divided into three lunettes of the Crucifixion and Saints (1493–96) by Pietro Perugino, commissioned by Dionisio and Giovanna Pucci.

The first chapel to the right of the entrance is the Cappella del Giglio (Chapel of St. Mary of the Lily) frescoed with depictions of Saints Filippo Neri, Bernard, Nereo, and Achilleo by the studio of Bernardino Poccetti, with an altarpiece by Domenico Passignano. The fourth chapel on the right has a stained glass window by Isabella, the daughter of Georges Henri Rouault. The choir chapel originally contained a fresco by Domenico Ghirlandaio but was rebuilt from 1685 to 1701 by Ciro Ferri and Pier Francesco Silvani. Ferri painted the altarpiece and Luca Giordano the flanking pieces. The statues of Penitence and Faith on the right were sculpted by Innocenzo Spinazzi, while Innocence and Religion on the left by Giovanni Monatauti. The bronze reliefs on the altar were made by Massimiliano Soldani-Benzi.

The interior also contains works by Giovanni and Cosimo Bizzelli, Jacopo Chiavistelli, Ottavio Vannini, Cosimo Rosselli, Cosimo Gamberucci, Leonardo del Tasso, Giuseppe Servolini, and Giuseppe Piattoli.

Gallery

See also
 The Virgin appearing to St. Bernard

Further reading

 Cristina Acidini. Santa Maria Maddalena de' Pazzi. La chiesa e il convento. [S.l.] Mandragora, 2020. .

 Luchs, Alison. "Cestello: A Cistercian Church of the Florentine Renaissance." PhD diss. Johns Hopkins University, 1976 (Garland Outstanding Dissertations in the Fine Arts, 1977).
Wundram, Manfred. Kunstführer Florenz. Stuttgart: Reclam, 1993, pages 227–228. .
 Frommers entry
Museums in Florence.

Roman Catholic churches in Florence
15th-century Roman Catholic church buildings in Italy
Renaissance architecture in Florence
Roman Catholic churches completed in 1500
Magdalene asylums